Champion oil field also known as Champion Field is a complex oil and gas field, situated 40 kilometres north-northwest of Bandar Seri Begawan, in water depths of 10 to 45 metres. The shallow part of the field is covered by coral reefs.

History

1970s 
Champion field was discovered in 1970 by Champion-1 which is drilled in its most northern part.  first oil platform was completed in 1972, to produce from shallow, oil-bearing intervals. 1974, a blow-out at Champion-41 caused a delay of the appraisal / development operations and to compensate for this delay, eight isolated appraisal wells were drilled in 1975 - 1976.

The Champion West field was discovered in 1975 by well CW-1 and it is located approximately 7 km north-northwest of the Champion Main field and 15 km northeast of Iron Duke. The depth of Champion West's area is approximately 40 m.

A blow-out occurred in the northern part of the main Champion field in well CP-141, early 1979. A grid concept for platform location was introduced for the shallow part of the main field in 1978 which consists of the bulk of the known oil reserves to ensure most of the future draining are within easy reach of a platform location.

1980s-1990s 
Construction of the centralised field facilities at Champion-7 began in 1980 until 1983.

As of 1996,  282 wells have been drilled, of which 118 are producing. The Peragam field lies directly below the producing Champion field and it was discovered by the Peragam-1 exploration well in 1990, Kasmadi Kaling and O'Rourke in 1993. Peragam-1 discovery was CW-8, drilled in early 1992 from the Champion West well jacket CWWJ-2 to test the oil and gas development of the shallower reservoirs. In 1996, it has a production rate of 1.5 million m3/day of gas from PGM-2.

2000s-2010s 
In 2006, Brunei reached its peak of production with 220,000 b/d to become the third largest producer of oil and gas in Asia but the depletion of the fields generated the decline of production down to 141,000 b/d in 2012.

Levels 
It is divided into 5 levels because of the level of thickness.

Platforms 

 Champion-1
 Champion-7 (Main Complex Platform)
 Champion-11
 Champion-41
 Champion-37
 Champion-38
 Champion-39

Gallery

References 

Oil fields in Brunei
Lists of oil and natural gas fields
Peak oil
Brunei-Muara District